Albert Gallup (January 30, 1796 – November 5, 1851) was a U.S. Representative from New York, serving on term from 1837 to 1839.

Early life
Gallup was born in East Berne, New York to Nathaniel Gallup (1770–1834) and Lucy (née Latham) Gallup (1773–1862).

His ancestors fought in the colonial wars, including, Capt. John Gallup, who was killed in the Narraganset Swamp fight with the Indians, and another, William Latham, who was killed at the Battle of New London.

As a child, Gallup received a limited schooling.  He later studied law, was admitted to the bar, and practiced in Albany.

Career
From 1831 to 1834, he served as sheriff of Albany County.

Congress 
Gallup was elected as a Democrat to the Twenty-fifth Congress serving from March 4, 1837 until March 3, 1839.  He was an unsuccessful candidate for reelection to the Twenty-sixth Congress in 1838.

He was appointed the U.S. collector of customs  for Albany in 1843.

Personal life
On April 26, 1818, he married Eunice Smith (1799–1872), daughter of Capt. Amos Denison Smith and Priscilla Mitchell. Together, they were the parents of:

 Caroline Gallup Reed (1821–1914), who was a noted educator and who married Rev. Sylvanus Reed (1821–1870)
 Albert Smith Gallup (1823–1906), who was a member of the Rhode Island House of Representatives from 1853 to 1854.
 Priscilla Gallup (b. 1828), who married George H. Whitney, in 1852.
 Lucy Gallup (b. 1832), who married Dr. Henry Delavan Paine (1816–1893), in 1858.
 Edwin C. Gallup (b. 1835), who married Anna B. Calket, in 1870.
 Eunice Ida Gallup (1840–1898), who married William W. Rhoades (1837–1893).
 Francis William Gallup (1841–1842), who died young.

Gallup died on November 5, 1851 in Providence, Rhode Island. He was interred in Swan Point Cemetery.

Descendants
He was the grandfather of Latham Gallup Reed (1855–1945), a prominent New York lawyer, and Anna Dewitt Reed (1858–1958), who married William Barclay Parsons (1859–1932) in 1884.

He was also grandfather of Isabel Whitney, a member of New York Society who married William H. Sage, of "Uplands" in Albany, New York.

References

External links

  This source gives his birthdate as January 20, 1796.
 

1796 births
1851 deaths
People from Berne, New York
Customs officers
New York (state) lawyers
Sheriffs of Albany County, New York
Burials at Swan Point Cemetery
Democratic Party members of the United States House of Representatives from New York (state)
19th-century American politicians
19th-century American lawyers